In physics, the Hamilton–Jacobi equation, named after William Rowan Hamilton and Carl Gustav Jacob Jacobi, is an alternative formulation of classical mechanics, equivalent to other formulations such as Newton's laws of motion, Lagrangian mechanics and Hamiltonian mechanics. The Hamilton–Jacobi equation is particularly useful in identifying conserved quantities for mechanical systems, which may be possible even when the mechanical problem itself cannot be solved completely.

The Hamilton–Jacobi equation is also the only formulation of mechanics in which the motion of a particle can be represented as a wave.  In this sense, it fulfilled a long-held goal of theoretical physics (dating at least to Johann Bernoulli in the eighteenth century) of finding an analogy between the propagation of light and the motion of a particle.  The wave equation followed by mechanical systems is similar to, but not identical with, Schrödinger's equation, as described below; for this reason, the Hamilton–Jacobi equation is considered the "closest approach" of classical mechanics to quantum mechanics.

In mathematics, the Hamilton–Jacobi equation is a necessary condition describing extremal geometry in generalizations of problems from the calculus of variations. It can be understood as a special case of the Hamilton–Jacobi–Bellman equation from dynamic programming.

Notation
Boldface variables such as  represent a list of  generalized coordinates,

A dot over a variable or list signifies the time derivative (see Newton's notation). For example,

The dot product notation between two lists of the same number of coordinates is a shorthand for the sum of the products of corresponding components, such as

Hamilton's principal function

Definition
Let the Hessian matrix  be invertible. The relation

shows that the Euler–Lagrange equations form a  system of second-order ordinary differential equations. Inverting the matrix  transforms this system into

Let a time instant  and a point  in the configuration space be fixed.

where

Formula for the momenta: pi(q,t) = ∂S/∂qi

Indeed, let a time instant  and a point  in the configuration space be fixed. Then

Mathematical formulation
Given the Hamiltonian  of a mechanical system, the Hamilton–Jacobi equation is a first-order, non-linear partial differential equation for the Hamilton's principal function ,

Alternatively, as described below, the Hamilton–Jacobi equation may be derived from Hamiltonian mechanics by treating  as the generating function for a canonical transformation of the classical Hamiltonian

Furthermore, the quantities

Comparison with other formulations of mechanics

The Hamilton–Jacobi equation is a single, first-order partial differential equation for the function  of the  generalized coordinates  and the time . Remarkably, the function  is equal to the classical action.

Similarly, Hamilton's equations of motion are another system of 2N first-order equations for the time evolution of the generalized coordinates and their conjugate momenta .

Since the HJE is an equivalent expression of an integral minimization problem such as Hamilton's principle, the HJE can be useful in other problems of the calculus of variations and, more generally,  in other branches of mathematics and physics, such as dynamical systems, symplectic geometry and quantum chaos.  For example, the Hamilton–Jacobi equations can be used to determine the geodesics on a Riemannian manifold, an important variational problem in Riemannian geometry.

Derivation using a canonical transformation
Any canonical transformation involving a type-2 generating function  leads to the relations

and Hamilton's equations in terms of the new variables  and new Hamiltonian  have the same form:

To derive the HJE, a generating function  is chosen in such a way that, it will make the new Hamiltonian . Hence, all its derivatives are also zero, and the transformed Hamilton's equations become trivial

so the new generalized coordinates and momenta are constants of motion.

Setting the generating function equal to Hamilton's principal function, plus an arbitrary constant :

the HJE automatically arises

or written in components for clarity

Action and Hamilton's functions
Hamilton's principal function S and classical function H are both closely related to action.

so the time derivative of S is

Therefore,

so S is actually the classical action plus an undetermined constant.

When H does not explicitly depend on time,

in this case W is the same as abbreviated action.

Separation of variables
The HJE is most useful when it can be solved via additive separation of variables, which directly identifies constants of motion.  For example, the time t can be separated if the Hamiltonian does not depend on time explicitly.  In that case, the time derivative  in the HJE must be a constant, usually denoted, giving the separated solution

where the time-independent function  is sometimes called Hamilton's characteristic function. The reduced Hamilton–Jacobi equation can then be written

To illustrate separability for other variables, a certain generalized coordinate  and its derivative  are assumed to appear together as a single function

in the Hamiltonian

In that case, the function S can be partitioned into two functions, one that depends only on qk and another that depends only on the remaining generalized coordinates

Substitution of these formulae into the Hamilton–Jacobi equation shows that the function ψ must be a constant (denoted here as ), yielding a first-order ordinary differential equation for 

In fortunate cases, the function  can be separated completely into  functions 

In such a case, the problem devolves to  ordinary differential equations.

The separability of S depends both on the Hamiltonian and on the choice of generalized coordinates.  For orthogonal coordinates and Hamiltonians that have no time dependence and are quadratic in the generalized momenta,  will be completely separable if the potential energy is additively separable in each coordinate, where the potential energy term for each coordinate is multiplied by the coordinate-dependent factor in the corresponding momentum term of the Hamiltonian (the Staeckel conditions).  For illustration, several examples in orthogonal coordinates are worked in the next sections.

Examples in various coordinate systems

Spherical coordinates
In spherical coordinates the Hamiltonian of a free particle moving in a conservative potential U can be written

The Hamilton–Jacobi equation is completely separable in these coordinates provided that there exist functions:  such that  can be written in the analogous form

Substitution of the completely separated solution

into the HJE yields

This equation may be solved by successive integrations of ordinary differential equations, beginning with the equation for 

where  is a constant of the motion that eliminates the  dependence from the Hamilton–Jacobi equation

The next ordinary differential equation involves the  generalized coordinate

where  is again a constant of the motion that eliminates the  dependence and reduces the HJE to the final ordinary differential equation

Elliptic cylindrical coordinates
The Hamiltonian in elliptic cylindrical coordinates can be written

The Hamilton–Jacobi equation is completely separable in these coordinates provided that  has an analogous form

Substitution of the completely separated solution

 into the HJE yields

Separating the first ordinary differential equation

yields the reduced Hamilton–Jacobi equation (after re-arrangement and multiplication of both sides by the denominator)

which itself may be separated into two independent ordinary differential equations

Parabolic cylindrical coordinates
The Hamiltonian in parabolic cylindrical coordinates can be written

The Hamilton–Jacobi equation is completely separable in these coordinates provided that  has an analogous form

Substitution of the completely separated solution

into the HJE yields

Separating the first ordinary differential equation

yields the reduced Hamilton–Jacobi equation (after re-arrangement and multiplication of both sides by the denominator)

which itself may be separated into two independent ordinary differential equations

Waves and particles

Optical wave fronts and trajectories 

The HJE establishes a duality between trajectories and wave fronts. For example, in geometrical optics, light can be considered either as “rays” or waves. The wave front can be defined as the surface  that the light emitted at time  has reached at time . Light rays and wave fronts are dual: if one is known, the other can be deduced.

From the above formulation, one can compute the ray paths using the Euler–Lagrange formulation; alternatively, one can compute the wave fronts by solving the Hamilton–Jacobi equation. Knowing one leads to knowing the other.

The above duality is very general and applies to all systems that derive from a variational principle: either compute the trajectories using Euler–Lagrange equations or the wave fronts by using Hamilton–Jacobi equation.

If  is known, the momentum is immediately deduced.

Once  is known, tangents to the trajectories  are computed by solving the equationfor , where  is the Lagrangian.

Relationship to the Schrödinger equation

The isosurfaces of the function  can be determined at any time t.  The motion of an -isosurface as a function of time is defined by the motions of the particles beginning at the points  on the isosurface.  The motion of such an isosurface can be thought of as a wave moving through -space, although it does not obey the wave equation exactly.  To show this, let S represent the phase of a wave

where  is a constant (Planck's constant) introduced to make the exponential argument dimensionless; changes in the amplitude of the wave can be represented by having  be a complex number.  The Hamilton–Jacobi equation is then rewritten as

which is the Schrödinger equation.

The classical limit of the Schrödinger equation above becomes identical to the following variant of the Hamilton–Jacobi equation,

Applications

HJE in a gravitational field

Using the energy–momentum relation in the form

Setting the four-momentum  equal to the four-gradient of the action ,

gives the Hamilton–Jacobi equation in the geometry determined by the metric :

in other words, in a gravitational field.

HJE in electromagnetic fields

For a particle of rest mass  and electric charge   moving in electromagnetic field with four-potential   in vacuum, the Hamilton–Jacobi equation in geometry determined by the metric tensor  has a form

and can be solved for the Hamilton principal action function  to obtain further solution for the particle trajectory and momentum:

, 

A circularly polarized wave 
In the case of circular polarization,

, 
, 

Hence

 
 
 
 

where , implying the particle moving along a circular trajectory with a permanent radius  and an invariable value of momentum  directed along a magnetic field vector.

A monochromatic linearly polarized plane wave 
For the flat, monochromatic, linearly polarized wave with a field  directed along the axis 

hence

 
 
 , 
 , 
 
 
 
 

implying the particle figure-8 trajectory with a long its axis oriented along the electric field  vector.

An electromagnetic wave with a solenoidal magnetic field 
For the electromagnetic wave with axial (solenoidal) magnetic field:

hence

 
 
 
 
 
 
 
 
 
 

where  is the magnetic field magnitude in a solenoid with the effective radius , inductivity , number of windings , and an electric current magnitude  through the solenoid windings. The particle motion occurs along the figure-8 trajectory in  plane set perpendicular to the solenoid axis with arbitrary azimuth angle  due to axial symmetry of the solenoidal magnetic field.

See also

 Canonical transformation
 Constant of motion
 Hamiltonian vector field
 Hamilton–Jacobi–Einstein equation
 WKB approximation
 Action-angle coordinates

References

Further reading

Hamiltonian mechanics
Symplectic geometry
Partial differential equations
William Rowan Hamilton